Donna Simpson (born 1970) is an Australian guitarist, vocalist, and songwriter. She is a member of the Australian folk rock band The Waifs. Donna's young sister Vikki Thorn (née Simpson) also plays harmonica and sings in the band. Simpson has released six albums with The Waifs; she wrote the single London Still, one of The Waifs' most successful singles to date.

Personal life
In 2003 Simpson married Ben Weaver, a US singer-songwriter. Together they had one son, who was born in 2005. During 2009, Simpson and Weaver got divorced.

In 2012, Simpson moved back to Western Australia. She has two sons (born in 2012 and 2013) and they all reside in Fremantle.

Discography

The Waifs
The Waifs (1996)
Shelter Me (1998)
Sink or Swim (2000)
Lighthouse EP (2003)
Up All Night (2003)
A Brief History... (2004)
Sun Dirt Water (2007)
Temptation (2011)
Beautiful You (2015)
"Ironbark" (2017)

Guest appearances and collaborations
John Dee Holeman & the Waifs Band (John Dee Holeman & The Waifs Band) (2007)

References

External links
Singer-songwriters Vikki Thorn and Donna Simpson

Living people
1970 births
People from Albany, Western Australia
Musicians from Western Australia
Australian women guitarists
21st-century Australian singers
21st-century Australian women singers
21st-century guitarists
21st-century women guitarists